Dimitrov  or  female version Dimitrova is a Bulgarian surname also popular in the Republic of North Macedonia meaning "son of Dimitar" or "Dimitar's", and may refer to:
 Alexander Dimitrov, Bulgarian historian and politician
 Anton Dimitrov, Bulgarian footballer
 Anton Dimitrov, Bulgarian footballer
 Atanas Dimitrov, Bulgarian footballer
 Boyan Dimitrov, Bulgarian mathematician
 Bozhidar Dimitrov, Bulgarian historian
 Detelin Dimitrov, Bulgarian footballer
 Darko Dimitrov, Macedonian composer and music producer
 Emil Dimitrov, Bulgarian singer
 Filip Dimitrov, Bulgarian politician
 Georgi Dimitrov, Bulgarian Communist leader
 G. M. Dimitrov, Bulgarian Agrarian politician
 Georgi Dimitrov Dimitrov, Bulgarian sociologist 
 Georgi Dimitrov (1959–2021), Bulgarian footballer
 Grigor Dimitrov (1991–) Bulgarian tennis player
 Ivaylo Dimitrov (1987–) Bulgarian footballer
 Ivaylo Dimitrov (1989–) Bulgarian footballer
 Krasimir Dimitrov, Bulgarian footballer
 Kristian Dimitrov, Bulgarian footballer
 Martin Dimitrov, Bulgarian footballer
 Nikolay Dimitrov (1987–) Bulgarian footballer
 Nikolay Dimitrov (1990–) Bulgarian footballer
 Petar Dimitrov, Bulgarian footballer
 Radoslav Dimitrov, Bulgarian footballer
 Rostislav Dimitrov, Bulgarian triple jumper
 Srđan Dimitrov, Serbian footballer
 Stanke Dimitrov, Bulgarian communist and anti-fascist
 Stefan Dimitrov, Bulgarian footballer
 Svetlin Dimitrov, Bulgarian handballer
 Tsvetan Dimitrov, Bulgarian footballer
 Velizar Dimitrov, Bulgarian footballer
 Vladimir Dimitrov (1882–1960), Bulgarian painter and draughtsman
 Vladimir Dimitrov (1968–), Bulgarian chess grandmaster
 Yancho Dimitrov, Bulgarian combat samboist, kickboxer and mixed martial artist in the heavyweight division.
 Yancho Dimitrov, Bulgarian footballer

Bulgarian-language surnames
Patronymic surnames
Surnames from given names